The Norddeutsche Bank was a German bank that existed from 1856 to 1929. It was established by Berenberg Bank, H.J. Merck & Co. and the bank house of Salomon Heine and private founders such as Robert Kayser as the first joint-stock bank in northern Germany, becoming the largest bank in Hamburg. In 1895 it was merged with the Disconto-Gesellschaft, but the two banks continued to operate separately. In 1929 both the Norddeutsche Bank and the Disconto-Gesellschaft were merged into Deutsche Bank.

References

Further reading
 Morten Reitmeyer: Bankiers im Kaiserreich. Sozialprofil und Habitus der deutschen Hochfinanz. Göttingen 1999, .

External links
 

 
Defunct banks of Germany
Banks established in 1856
1929 disestablishments in Germany
Deutsche Bank